Florida's 19th congressional district is a U.S. congressional district in Southwest Florida. It includes the cities of Cape Coral, Fort Myers, Fort Myers Beach, Sanibel, Bonita Springs, Naples and Marco Island, as well as unincorporated areas in Lee and Collier counties. It has been represented by Republican Byron Donalds since 2021.

History 
The 19th district was created as a result of the redistricting cycle after the 1980 Census.

Presidential election history

List of members representing the district

Election results

2002

2004

2006

2008

2010 (Special)

2010

2012

2014 (Special)

2014

2016

2018

2020

2022

References

 Congressional Biographical Directory of the United States 1774–present

19